Henry Woodhouse (c. 1545 – 8 October 1624), of Hickling and Waxham, Norfolk, was an English politician.

Henry Woodhouse was the second son of Sir William Woodhouse and his second wife Elizabeth Calthorpe, widow of Sir Henry Parker.

He was a Member of Parliament (MP) for Norfolk in 1572 and 1589.

Family
Henry Woodhouse married firstly Anne Bacon, daughter of Sir Nicholas Bacon. Their children included;
 William Woodhouse, married Frances Jermyn, daughter of Sir Robert Jermyn of Rushbrooke.
 Henry Woodhouse, Governor of Bermuda.
 Mary Woodhouse, married (1) Robert Killigrew, their children included; William Killigrew (1606–1695) and Catherine Killigrew, married (2) Thomas Stafford (MP).
 Vere Woodhouse, married Mr Godfrey.
 Elizabeth Woodhouse, married Sir Francis Stoner.
 Anne married (1) Henry Hogan of East Bradenham, (2) William Hungate, also of East Bradenham (3) in May 1615, Sir Julius Caesar, Master of the Rolls.

Henry Woodhouse married secondly Cecily Gresham, daughter of Thomas Gresham. Their children included;
 Gresham Woodhouse (1588-1656), in 1602 his grandmother Beatrice Gresham gave him a property called Bolthurst in Limpsfield, he was buried at Wendover.
 Elizabeth Woodhouse (1598-1652), married the politician and antiquarian William Hakewill.

References

1545 births
1624 deaths
People from North Norfolk (district)
English MPs 1572–1583
English MPs 1589
People from Hickling, Norfolk
Members of the Parliament of England for Norfolk